Fettah Güney (born 21 May 1937) is a Turkish former sports shooter. He competed in the trap event at the 1972 Summer Olympics.

References

1937 births
Living people
Turkish male sport shooters
Olympic shooters of Turkey
Shooters at the 1972 Summer Olympics
People from Aydın
20th-century Turkish people